Elbert County High School is a four-year public comprehensive high school located in Elbert County, Georgia, United States. It serves the students of Elberton and Elbert County. The school colors are navy and white. The Blue Devils compete in GHSA Region 8-A. The school's operation hours are 7:30am–2:45pm.

Notable alumni
 Clark Gaines, running back for the New York Jets of the National Football League
 Mecole Hardman, wide receiver for the Kansas City Chiefs of the National Football League

References

External links 
 Elbert County High School

Education in Elbert County, Georgia
Public high schools in Georgia (U.S. state)